The 2022–23 season is the 16th in the history of 1. FC Heidenheim and their ninth consecutive season in the second division. The club will participate in the 2. Bundesliga and the DFB-Pokal.

Players

Pre-season and friendlies

Competitions

Overall record

2. Bundesliga

League table

Results summary

Results by round

Matches 
The league fixtures were announced on 17 June 2022.

DFB-Pokal

References

1. FC Heidenheim seasons
1. FC Heidenheim